Werner P. Zibaso (1910–1983) was a German screenwriter.

Selected filmography

 Gordian the Tyrant (1937)
 Everything Will Be Better in the Morning (1948)
 When the Evening Bells Ring (1951)
 A Thousand Red Roses Bloom (1952)
 We'll Talk About Love Later (1953)
 When The Village Music Plays on Sunday Nights (1953)
 Daybreak (1954)
 Jackboot Mutiny (1955)
 Lost Child 312 (1955)
 The Old Forester House (1956)
 The Golden Bridge (1956)
 Where the Ancient Forests Rustle (1956)
 Winter in the Woods (1956)
 Ballerina (1956)
 Black Forest Melody (1956)
 The Doctor of Stalingrad (1958)
 The Priest and the Girl (1958)
 The Domestic Tyrant (1959)
 Nick Knatterton’s Adventure (1959)
 We Will Never Part (1960)
 An Alibi for Death (1963)
 Die Letzten drei der Albatross (1965)
 A Handful of Heroes (1967)
 Love Nights in the Taiga (1967)
 Emma Hamilton (1968)
 Madame and Her Niece (1969)
 Tiger Gang (1971)
 Housewives on the Job (1972)
 Nurse Report (1972)
 The Girl from Hong Kong (1973)
 Hubertus Castle (1973)
 The Hunter of Fall (1974)
 Crime After School (1975)
 Silence in the Forest (1976)
 Arrête ton char... bidasse! (1977)
 Women in Hospital (1977)
 Inn of the Sinful Daughters (1978)
 Tendres Cousines (1980)

References

Bibliography
 Rentschler, Eric. The Films of G.W. Pabst: An Extraterritorial Cinema. Rutgers University Press, 1990.

External links

1910 births
1983 deaths
German male screenwriters
People from Bad Homburg vor der Höhe
Film people from Hesse
20th-century German screenwriters